Myriam Verreault is a Canadian film director and screenwriter. She is most noted for her 2019 film Kuessipan, for which she received a Canadian Screen Award nomination for Best Adapted Screenplay at the 8th Canadian Screen Awards, and two Prix Iris nominations for Best Director and Best Screenplay at the 22nd Quebec Cinema Awards.

Her other works have included the documentary film West of Pluto (À l'ouest de Pluton) and the web documentary My Tribe Is My Life (Ma tribu c'est ma vie), as well as an editing credit on  Olivier Higgins and Mélanie Carrier's 2013 documentary film Québékoisie.

In 2020 she was the patron and curator of the Festival Vues dans la tête de... film festival in Rivière-du-Loup.

See also
 List of female film and television directors

References

External links

21st-century Canadian screenwriters
21st-century Canadian women writers
Canadian documentary film directors
Canadian women film directors
Canadian screenwriters in French
Film directors from Quebec
Writers from Quebec
Canadian film editors
Canadian women film editors
French Quebecers
Living people
Year of birth missing (living people)
Canadian women documentary filmmakers